Silvermints is an Irish sugar-based peppermint-flavoured hard sweet or candy.

Clarendon Confectionery, part of the Jacob Fruitfield Food Group, first introduced Silvermints in the 1920s.  Traditionally sold in a foil-packed tube, as of 2006 they are also sold in a 120g cello bag.

See also
List of breath mints

External links
Jacob Fruitfield Food Group - the manufacturer of Silvermints

Irish confectionery
Brand name confectionery
Breath mints